Hudson Kennaugh (born 12 January 1981) is a South African professional motorcycle racer. He currently competes in the British National Superstock 1000 championship aboard a BMW S1000RR. He is a former South African Superbike champion, he rode the 2009 British Supersport Championship, for the Linxcel-Seton Tuning Team. His surname is of Manx descent and is pronounced 'Ken-Oh'.(Although, the surname on the Isle of Man is pronounced as 'Kenyk' rather like the word 'cognac' only starting with 'ken' rather than 'con')

Early years
Born in Natal, South Africa, Kennaugh began racing mini-moto aged 5, winning the Junior South African Motocross championship in 1993. He turned to road racing a year later, and in 1995 he came 4th in the South African 125cc championship aboard a Yamaha YZ125 road bike. The Yamaha YZ125 road bike featured a hydroformed exhaust manufactured by Hylton Spencer. Four years of 250cc racing followed.

South African Superbike championship
Kennaugh contested the South African Supersport 600cc championship in 2002 and 2003, finishing 8th and 3rd in the championship. He then moved up to the 1000cc Superbike class, winning the title at his first attempt.

Britain and Beyond
Kennaugh did one-off races in the GSX-R Cup in both 2003 and 2004, and contested the championship full-time in 2005, winning the title. He also made two World Supersport Championship starts at the end of 2005, with the Moto – 1 team.

Kennaugh moved to England in 2006 and contested that year's British Superstock Championship for the Raceways team. He started 2007 in Superstocks, but also contested several rounds of the British Superbike Championship on a Virgin Yamaha, without much success. For 2008 he mounted a challenge for the British Supersport Championship, taking on Australian Glen Richards' Triumph, taking a dominant win at Mallory Park and three poles. He ultimately finished second to Richards in the standings, despite a further win at Silverstone. Kennaugh was also a wildcard entry in the 2008 World Supersport rounds at Brands Hatch and Donington Park, finishing 10th and 5th.

In 2009, Kennaugh joined the Linxcel-Seton Tuning Team, again in Supersport on a Yamaha. He recorded two pole positions but his best race result was a pair of fourth places. On 14 August Kennaugh announced on his website that he and the Linxcel-Seton Tuning Team had gone their separate ways. He joined Gearlink Kawasaki to replace the injured Chris Martin, but results did not improve.

In 2010 finished second in the British Superbike Evo class starting on a Kawasaki Ninja ZX-10R and after the team folded moved to the split lath Aprilia RSV4 recording multiple wins before losing the championship by one point. Went on to compete in the 2011 British Superbike Championship with a few point scoring rides.

2012 saw a change to super stock Kawasaki machinery. This season was a setback because, Kennaugh crashed on the opening lap at the Thruxton Circuit and broke his back. Upon return from injury, he rode for the GR Aprilia Superstock team changing back to the Ionic balance Kawasaki for the final round finishing 4th

2013 meant joining forces with Tony Homer Racing, the team recorded 5 victories, multiple podiums and the British Superstock championship. Kennaugh was the first South African to win a British Title since Jon Ekerold won the world championship in the 1980s

In 2014 Kennaugh switched to BMW machinery recorded one victory, multiple podiums and came 4th in the championship with Linxcel BMW race team.

2015 was the birth of the Trik Moto BMW race team. Kennaugh recorded mulple victories and podiums and competed at the Isle of Man TT races where a crash in the lightweight race at Bradden Bridge saw Kennaugh receive a broken back which hindered his Superstock challenge ending the year in third place.

2016 sees the continuation of the Trik Moto BMW team partnered by Bahnstormer BMW and Spoortech with high expectations.

Career statistics

All Time

British Supersport Championship
(key) (Races in bold indicate pole position, races in italics indicate fastest lap)

British Superbike Championship
(key)

References

External links
 Personal Website

1981 births
Living people
People from Natal
British Supersport Championship riders
British Superbike Championship riders
Isle of Man TT riders
Supersport World Championship riders
South African motorcycle racers